The inland hill rat (Bunomys penitus) is a species of rodent in the family Muridae. It is found only in central and southern Sulawesi, Indonesia.

References

Bunomys
Rats of Asia
Endemic fauna of Indonesia
Rodents of Sulawesi
Mammals described in 1921
Taxa named by Ned Hollister
Taxa named by Gerrit Smith Miller Jr.
Taxonomy articles created by Polbot